Strange Weather Films is a  company founded in 2010.

Strange Weather Films founded by Andrew Adamson and Aron Warner (the creative team behind the Shrek and The Chronicles of Narnia franchises) is a Los Angeles-based company which finances and develops motion picture, television and original programming.

The latest film  Cirque du Soleil: Worlds Away was released in cinemas on 21 December 2012.

References

http://strangeweather.me

Film production companies of the United States